The Juso-Hochschulgruppen (Juso University Groups) are a part of the Young Socialists in the SPD and represent the student wing of the Social Democratic Party of Germany. They took over the role of the student wing after the party split with the Sozialistischer Deutscher Studentenbund in 1961 and its replacement, the Sozialdemokratischer Hochschulbund (SHB), had become too radical by 1972.

References

External links
Official webpage

Social Democratic Party of Germany
Student wings of social democratic parties
1973 establishments in Germany